The INAS 321 is an Indian naval air squadron based at INS Shikra, Mumbai.

References 

Aircraft squadrons of the Indian Navy
Naval units and formations of India